The ZIS-6 is a Soviet general purpose 6×4 army cargo truck, a three-axle version of the ZIS-5 two-axle truck. It was built from 1933 until October 1941 at the Moscow Zavod imeni Stalina factory and reached a total production of 21,239.

A reliable truck, it served as a base for the creation of a number of specialized military modifications- searchlight truck, radio and radio repair station, mobile field workshop, supply delivering vehicle, troops moving vehicle, and as an artillery towing vehicle, but is best known for its role as the first multiple rocket launcher (Katyusha) in July 1941. It was built by the "Compressor" Plant's Design Office during World War II (1941–45). Very few ZIS-6 trucks survive till today.

During early World War II the ZIS-6 served as the chassis of the original BM-13 Katyusha multiple rocket launcher, nicknamed "Stalin's Organ" by German soldiers. The ZIS-6 also served as the basis for the VVS-RKKA aircraft fueller BZ-ZIS-6.

Specification
6×4, 3-axle 2,5-ton (4-ton - highway)
ZIS-5 based truck
Bore/Stroke: 101.6/114.3 mm
Wheelbase: +
Tyres:

See also

Military trucks of the Soviet Union
ZiL vehicles
World War II vehicles of the Soviet Union
Military vehicles introduced in the 1930s